Dobromierz Transmitter (Polish: SLR Dobromierz) is an 88 metre tall Radio and Television tower situated in Dobromierz, Poland. On the top of this concrete tower, there is a horizontal steel cross.
At the ends of the crossarms, which are equipped with gangways, the antenna mast on its top.

Transmitted programs

The tower is used for transmitting the following FM and TV programs

FM radio

Digital television MPEG-4

External links
EmiTel
RadioPolska
Coverage Map dvbtmap.eu
DVB-T in Świętokrzyskie

See also
List of towers

Towers in Poland
Communications in Poland
Włoszczowa County
Buildings and structures in Świętokrzyskie Voivodeship